Bayside station may refer to:
 Bayside station (LIRR), a Long Island Rail Road station in Queens, New York City, US 
 Bayside Station, a monorail station on the Disney Resort Line in Tokyo, Japan
 College/Bayside station, a Metromover station in downtown Miami, Florida, US
 Bayside railway station, a railway station in Sutton, Dublin, Ireland

See also
 Bayside (disambiguation)